Royal Air Force Madley, or more simply RAF Madley, was a Royal Air Force station situated  south west of Hereford in Herefordshire, England. The station was in use during the Second World War as a training base and was located between the villages of Kingstone and Madley.

History
The site opened as a training centre for aircrew and ground wireless operators on 27 August 1941. In 1941, No. 4 Signals School RAF was stated up at the base. The school was disbanded and renamed as No. 4 Radio School RAF in January 1943.

In 1943, the grass airfield was reinforced with Sommerfeld Tracking and the centre's population rose to about 5,000. Also in 1943, RAF Madley became a base for one of ten Royal Air Force Mountain Rescue Teams (MRT) that had been set up to rescue lost aircrew. The site was visited in 1944 prior to D-Day by US General George S. Patton, and later by Rudolf Hess (who had been held prisoner near Abergavenny) on his way to the Nuremberg Trials in 1946.

The station was not bombed by the Luftwaffe, however, as with other bases, crashes of friendly aircraft were commonplace. On Christmas Day 1944, a Liberator crashed in the station environs which precipitated the usual search for the crew. This had proved fruitless as the crew had baled out over Belgium as they assumed the heavily flak-damaged aircraft was about to crash. However, the aircraft somehow made it all the way to Madley without its aircrew.

The comedian and actor Eric Sykes was a radio operator at RAF Madley during the Second World War.

Units posted here
 No. 4 Radio School (January 1943 - December 1946)
 No. 4 Signals School (August 1941 - January 1943)
 No. 8 Anti-Aircraft Co-operation Unit RAF (July 1941 – 1943)
 No. 25 Maintenance Unit (April 1952 - March 1954)
 No. 26 Squadron RAF detachment during 1942 using the North American Mustang I
 No. 50 Gliding School  RAF(January 1946– January 1947)

Current use

Today only a few hangars remain, and Madley Communications Centre now occupies part of the site. Other parts of the site have been converted into a wildlife wetlands centre that is used for study. The B4352 and an unclassified road now cut what was the airfield area in two.

See also
List of former Royal Air Force stations

References

Bibliography

External links
 MESC-RAF History

Royal Air Force stations in Herefordshire